Kepler's Books and Magazines is an independent bookstore in Menlo Park, California. It was founded on May 14, 1955 by Roy Kepler. He previously had worked as a staff member of radio station KPFA, listener-supported and based in Berkeley. The bookstore "soon blossomed into a cultural epicenter and attracted loyal customers from the students and faculty of Stanford University and from other members of the surrounding communities who were interested in serious books and ideas."

Sixties counterculture
John Markoff in his 2005 text, What the Dormouse Said: How the Sixties Counterculture Shaped the Personal Computer Industry, referred to Kepler's as an important meeting place for the Counterculture of the 1960s. The Palo Alto Weekly noted that, "through the 60s and 70s, the culture of Kepler's began to evolve into a broader counter-culture. Beat intellectuals and pacifists were joined by 'people who worked for Whole Earth, hippies into the rock and roll and recreational drug scene, politicos, and people with an interest in ethnic groups'." The Grateful Dead gave live shows there and "folk singer Joan Baez, members of the Grateful Dead, and many local leaders remember sharing ideas, political action, music, and danger in the cramped store."

According to Scott W. Allen's Aces Back to Back (1992), the roots of the Grateful Dead's musical family tree were sown at Kepler's Books in 1960. That year, the Hunter/ Garcia folk duo played there and at universities and colleges all over the Bay Area. "From this point on," says Jerry Garcia, "I kept going farther into music and [Robert] Hunter into writing."

Recent history
In 1980, Roy Kepler's son Clark took over management of the bookstore. The store had three different locations in Menlo Park, moving in 1989 to its current location in the Menlo Center on El Camino Real. In 1990 Publishers Weekly ranked Kepler's as “Bookseller of the Year.”

The rise of chain bookstores and online shopping created unbeatable competition, rising prices in Menlo Park resulted in Kepler's closing its doors on August 31, 2005. The local community held demonstrations to protest the closing.  Kepler's subsequently re-opened in October 2005, financed by community investments, volunteers and donations.

In 2008, The Kepler's children's department won the Pannell Award for excellence. The 2008 documentary Paperback Dreams chronicles the related histories of independent bookstores Kepler's and the now defunct Cody's Books in Berkeley, California.

In 2012, Clark Kepler and Praveen Madan, of San Francisco's The Booksmith, put together the Kepler's "Transition Team," a group of volunteer local business and community leaders. It launched “Kepler’s 2020,” an initiative seeking to transform the independent bookstore into a next-generation community literary and cultural center. The project aims to "create a hybrid business model that includes a for-profit, community-owned-and-operated bookstore, and a nonprofit organization that will feature on-stage author interviews, lectures by leading intellectuals, educational workshops and other literary and cultural events," according to Kepler's press release. Under the Kepler's 2020 program Kepler's was split into two legal entities – a for-profit business with a social mission and a community sponsored nonprofit – with the complementary goals of fostering a culture of books, ideas and 'intellectual discourse and civic engagement in the community,' according to Kepler's press release."

Since 2012 Kepler's successful turnaround and reinvention have continued to receive wide coverage in national and international press because of public's interest in finding sustainable models to keep bookstores thriving.

See also
Cody's Books
Printers Inc. Bookstore

Further reading
Markoff, John. What the Dormouse Said: How the Sixties Counterculture Shaped the Personal Computer Industry. New York: Penguin, 2005.

Notes

External links 
 
 The Kepler's 2020 Project
 SaveKeplers.com
 Photograph of Kepler's
Kepler's Books: Paperback Dreams

Bookstores in the San Francisco Bay Area
Independent bookstores of the United States
Companies based in Menlo Park, California
Bookstores established in the 20th century
American companies established in 1955
Retail companies established in 1955
1955 establishments in California